Petersburg is an unincorporated community off Comfort Road, in Onslow County, North Carolina, United States, north-northeast of Richlands. It is part of the Jacksonville, North Carolina Metropolitan Statistical Area.

References

 

Unincorporated communities in Onslow County, North Carolina
Unincorporated communities in North Carolina